Yuny Strait is a strait in Severnaya Zemlya, Russia. It is covered with ice most of the year.

History
Initially named Proliv Yungshturm after the Roter Jungsturm of the German Communist Youth, following the Great Patriotic War, its name was changed to Yuny (Youth).

Geography
The Yuny Strait is a maximum -wide strait that separates Pioneer Island from Komsomolets Island, connecting the Kara Sea in the northwest with the Red Army Strait in the southeast.

References

Straits of Severnaya Zemlya
Straits of Krasnoyarsk Krai
Straits of the Kara Sea